Filemon Castelar Lagman (March 17, 1953 – February 6, 2001), popularly known as Ka Popoy, was a revolutionary socialist and workers' leader in the Philippines. He shares the ideology of Marxism-Leninism. He split with the Communist Party of the Philippines in 1991 to form Bukluran ng Manggagawang Pilipino (BMP) and the multi-sectoral group Sanlakas.

From the split, he led the formation of the Partido ng Manggagawang Pilipino (Filipino Workers' Party), an underground revolutionary socialist party, which, after his death, merged with the Sosyalistang Partido ng Paggawa (Socialist Party of Labor) and the Partido para sa Proletaryong Demokrasya (Party for Proletarian Democracy).

During the First Quarter Storm, he was a member of Samahang Demokratiko ng Kabataan (Democratic Association of the Youth) in the 1970s. After only a year in college at the University of the Philippines, he decided to go underground and do full-time organizing work in the factories and urban poor communities in the northern sector of Metro Manila. Ka Popoy was elected Secretary of the Manila-Rizal Regional Party Committee of the CPP in the mid-70's and spearheaded the broad formation which challenged the Marcos dictatorship in 1978 Batasan Pambansa elections. The Central Committee of the CPP admonished Ka Popoy and the whole regional committee for advocating participation in 1978 Batasan Pambansa elections because it ran counter to the CC call to head to the countryside to wage armed struggle against the dictatorship. Ka Popoy was only to return at the helm of the Manila-Rizal Regional Party Committee after the EDSA uprising of 1986. In spite of the differences with the central leadership, Ka Popoy strived harder to strengthen revolutionary work in the capital city.

Ka Popoy is also known to be the only Party leader that during the struggles with the CPP that put forward the most comprehensive and in-depth critique against the basic Party documents of CPP-NPA which are now popularly known as Counter-Thesis 1 (PSR: A Semi-feudal Alibi for Protracted War, PPDR: Class Line vs. Mass Line and PPW: A New-Type Revolution of the Wrong Type) and Counter-Thesis 2 (On the Reorientation of the Party Work and the Reorganization of the Party Machinery).

He was shot dead in Bahay ng Alumni, University of the Philippines Diliman in Quezon City on February 6, 2001. His assassination is speculated to have been carried out by a pro-Estrada faction of the military, aiming to destabilize the newly formed Arroyo government. Further investigation by the police revealed that the assassins and the culprits may have come from the Revolutionary Proletarian Army-Alex Boncayao Brigade, another "rejectionist" faction of the CPP. The perpetrators have not yet been apprehended as of 2008. In July 2007, the Quezon City Prosecutor's Office decided to drop the case on eight suspected communist assassins since the witnesses were unable to attend the preliminary investigations.

Personal life
Filemon grew up in Caloocan. He was a track and field athlete of Caloocan High School. He was of short stature (perhaps about 5'6" in height). His belligerence started to manifest during his early high school days whenever he voices out his communistic beliefs by being argumentative against a few teachers that contradicted his ideologies. Then Superintendent of City Schools, Mrs. Modesta G. Boquiren "played politics" and heeded his voice on occasions by not contradicting him. Lagman found friendship with Mrs. Boquiren's nephew Florante "Randy" Deguzman as his temporary running mate in high school. Filemon graduated in 1970 while Florante in 1971. They've lost contact in College days.

Filemon's first wife was Dodi Garduce, while second wife was Bobbie Jopson (sister of another revolutionary martyr Edgar Jopson, owners of Jopson's Supermarket in Sampaloc, Manila). His brother is current Albay congressman Edcel Lagman.

Death and legacy
When Martial Law was declared on 21 September 1972, Lagman established the first network of the underground revolutionary movement in Navotas. He organized, along with his comrades, the labor unions in factories and other work sites, launched mass mobilizations, developed a political mass base among workers and recruited more party members for the CPP.

At the height of the CPP split, Lagman wrote the biggest critique on CPP founding chair Jose Maria Sison's book Philippine Society and Revolution—the Counter-thesis. Lagman argued in his critique that Philippine society was capitalist in a backward and underdeveloped way, rather than being semi-feudal and semi-colonial. Lagman thus posited that a workers-led revolution must be waged to dismantle capitalism, instead of a protracted people's war from the countryside.

Lagman was ambushed and shot to death by two unknown assassins on the afternoon of 6 February 2001, at the east-side steps of the University of the Philippines Bahay ng Alumni in Diliman, Quezon City. At the time of his death, Ka Popoy was working on the launch of the Partido ng Manggagawa, the workers' political party that would participate in the 2001 mid-term elections, among other revolutionary tasks for the Filipino working class.

References

External links
  Filemon 'Ka Popoy' Lagman Archive at Marxists Internet Archive
  Who is Ka Popoy Lagman? (from the official Labour Party website)

Filipino communists
Filipino trade union leaders
Assassinated activists
Kapampangan people
People from Quezon City
1953 births
2001 deaths
Assassinated Filipino people
People murdered in the Philippines